The 1999 Men's Ice Hockey World Championships was the 63rd such event sanctioned by the International Ice Hockey Federation (IIHF). Teams representing 41 countries participated in several levels of competition. The competition also served as qualifications for group placements in the 2000 competition.

World Championship Group A

The Championship took place between sixteen teams in Norway.

 (2nd, Group 1 Qualifier)

 (2nd, Group 2 Qualifier)

 (Far East Qualifier)

 (Host)

 (1st, Group 2 Qualifier)
 (1st, Group 1 Qualifier)

World Championship Group B

Played at Odense and Rodovre, Denmark April 8–17.  The top three teams at the end of the tournament advanced to the qualifying round for the 2000 IIHF World Championship.  The Germans, after failing to qualify for Group A, lost their final game to Kazakhstan and finished fourth.  The twentieth place overall was by far the worst finish in their history.

Final Round 17–24 Place

Denmark, Great Britain, and Kazakhstan all advanced to the qualifiers for the 2000 IIHF World Championship.  Hungary was relegated to Group C.

World Championship Group C
Played at Eindhoven and Tilburg, Netherlands April 5–11.  While eight teams had qualified for the Group C tournament, the host Dutch government had suspended diplomatic relations with Yugoslavia, due to the Kosovo War, and did not allow the Yugoslavian team to participate in the tournament.

First round

Group 1

Group 2

Final Round 25–28 Place

The Netherlands was promoted to Group B.

Final Round 29–32 Place
 Because Yugoslavia was unable to participate for political reasons, the IIHF officially maintained their 30th place from the previous World Championship.

No team was relegated, with Yugoslavia resuming their place in 2000 the tournament was played with nine teams.

World Championship Group D
Played at Krugersdorp, South Africa April 14–20

First round

Group 1

Group 2

Group 3

Final Round 33–35 Place

Spain was promoted to Group C.

Consolation round 36–38 Place

Consolation round 39–41 Place

See also
 World Juniors
 Women's Championships

Citations

References
Complete results

Men's World Ice Hockey Championships
IIHF Men's World Ice Hockey Championships